The parliament of Kosovo is due to hold an indirect election for president of Kosovo on or before 2026, with a second or third round of voting if necessary.

The constitution states that the presidential election must be held on or before 30 days prior to the end of the current president's term.  This will be the sixth presidential election in Kosovo since 2008, when Kosovo declared its independence.

Background
The incumbent president of Kosovo, Vjosa Osmani, took office on 4 April 2021 and her term is due to end on 4 April 2026.  If Osmani serves out her term in full, the new presidential term will begin in 2026 and will be due to end in 2031.  Osmani would be eligible for re-election for a second and final five-year term in 2026.

Electoral system
Initially, a candidate is required to receive at least 80 votes, equivalent to two-thirds of the 120 members of the Assembly, in order to be elected.  However, if no candidate succeeds during the first two rounds, a third round is held between the top two candidates of the second round, and the requirement is reduced to a simple majority of 61 votes.  If the third round also does not produce a successful candidate, the Assembly is dissolved, with new elections to take place within 45 days.

See also
Politics of Kosovo

References

External links
President of Kosovo

Presidential elections in Kosovo